All Out Motorsports was an American professional stock car racing team that used to compete in the NASCAR Gander RV & Outdoors Truck Series. The team used to field the No. 7 Toyota Tundra for Korbin Forrister.

Gander RV & Outdoors Truck Series

Truck No. 7 history

On January 31, 2018, it was announced that driver Korbin Forrister had formed his own race team, fielding the No. 7 Toyota Tundra for himself. Forrister and the team announced a 10 race schedule for the 2018 season; Daytona, Dover, Charlotte, Iowa, Chicagoland, Eldora, Michigan, Bristol, Talladega, and Phoenix. He also ran the race at Atlanta and Texas. Forrister failed to qualify for Charlotte because of a qualifying rainout. Reid Wilson attempted the fall race at Texas, but failed to qualify.

After running part-time schedules in 2018 and 2019, crew chief Wally Rogers indicated on June 18, 2019 that the team had closed. Reports also included shop doors being locked and employees having been fired. Forrister said the following day that the team was still functioning, just regrouping and reorganizing.

The team attempted their next race at Talladega in October 2019, with Danny Gill replacing Rogers as crew chief, as Rogers had moved to Jordan Anderson Racing to be the crew chief of their No. 3 truck after All Out stopped attempting races for many months. Forrister finished 13th in the race.

All Out Motorsports returned for 2020, running the first few races.

Team is not longer competing in the truck series at the moment and is closed.

Truck No. 7 results

 Season still in progress

References

External links
 

American companies established in 2018
American auto racing teams
Auto racing teams established in 2018